Ballyseedy is a townland in County Kerry, Ireland. It was historically situated in the parish of Ballyseedy, within the barony of Trughanacmy. The townland contains a number of notable landmarks, including Ballyseedy Wood, a bridge over the Ballycarty River and a ruined Protestant church. There is also a large restored castle (Ballyseedy Castle) which is in use as a hotel.

Location
A section of the River Lee, from which Tralee takes its name, forms the northern edge of the townland.

History
Ballyseedy Wood is an ancient woodland dating at least to the 16th century, when it was mapped by Sir Edward Denny. The wood contains the ruins of Ballyseedy House (or Old Ballyseedy Castle). Alongside nearby "New" Ballyseedy Castle (now restored as a hotel). The main S block was remodelled in medieval-revival style by James Franklin Fuller.

This was the seat of the Blennerhassett family from around 1586 to 1967.

Ballyseedy massacre

The townland was the scene of an atrocity in the Irish Civil War in which eight anti-Treaty IRA prisoners were killed by their captors, members of the Free State forces. The lone survivor was Stephen Fuller TD.

Demographics
In the 2002 census, Ballyseedy had a population of 127. By the 2006 Census, it had a population of 474.

See also
 List of towns and villages in Ireland
 List of baronies of Ireland

References

Towns and villages in County Kerry
Townlands of County Kerry